Phalangioidea is a superfamily of the harvestman suborder Eupnoi with five recognized families and more than 1,500 species.

It is not to be confused with the similar spelled subfamily Phalangodoidea, which is also a harvestman superfamily, but within the suborder Laniatores.

Families
 Monoscutidae (5 genera, 32 species)
 Neopilionidae (8 genera, 15 species)
 Sclerosomatidae (148 genera, 1273 species)
 Stygophalangiidae (1 species: Stygophalangium karamani Oudemans, 1933) (former Yugoslavia)
 Phalangiidae (49 genera, 381 species)
 Protolophidae (1 genus Protolophus) Banks, 1893

Harvestmen
Arachnid superfamilies